Europtera punctillata is a species of Lasiocampidae moth native to Madagascar.

The wings have a cinnamon-brown colour. The males have a wingspan of 35–43 mm and the females of 62mm

References
 

Lasiocampidae
Lepidoptera of Madagascar
Moths described in 1884
Moths of Madagascar
Moths of Africa